Harbin Institute of Technology Museum on 59 Gongsi Street, Harbin, China is the official museum of Harbin Institute of Technology. The present building was the building of General Consulate of Russian Federation in Harbin from 1906, and was transformed into classroom building of Harbin Institute of Technology in 1920. The museum was established in May 2010.

Galleries
 Historical Exhibition Hall: The exhibition illustrates the history of HIT and its cultural traditions.
 Thematical Exhibition Hall: The specified exhibition focuses on alumni, major research achievements of the university.
Multiple languages of guided tour are provided, including Mandarin, English, Russian, Japanese and Korean.

References

Museums in Heilongjiang
Harbin Institute of Technology
Tourist attractions in Harbin